Cyperochloa is a genus of Australian plants in the grass family. 	The only known species is Cyperochloa hirsuta, found in the Esperance Plains region of Western Australia.

References

Panicoideae
Endemic flora of Western Australia
Poales of Australia
Monotypic Poaceae genera